Warren Wain Lee (born 27 August 1987) is an Indian-born English former professional cricketer who played List A cricket for Kent County Cricket Club and Unicorns. Lee was born in India at  New Delhi and educated at Eaglesfield School and Shooters Hill Sixth Form College in Greenwich in south-east London.

A right arm medium-fast bowler, Lee played Second XI cricket for Kent from 2006 before making his List A cricket debut for Kent against Somerset in April 2009.

He played twice for Kent in 2009 before his contract was renewed at the end the season, but was released by the county part way through the 2010 season. He also made appearances for the Second XIs of Middlesex, Surrey and Worcestershire before playing for Unicorns in 11 List A matches in 2012 and 2013.

Lee has played for Blackheath and Bickley Park in the Kent Cricket League and has appeared for MCC in non-first-class matches.

References

External links

Living people
1987 births
English cricketers
Kent cricketers
Unicorns cricketers
People from New Delhi